Wing Foon Ong (February 4, 1904 – December 19, 1977) was the first Chinese-American not born in the United States to be elected to a state House of Representatives when in 1946 he ran for the Arizona House of Representatives and won. In 1966, Ong ran for the Arizona State Senate and won, becoming the first Chinese-American to enter the State Senate.

Early years
Ong (birth name:  Ong Yut Ning) was born in Canton, Guangdong, China to Ong Dao Lung, a United States-born Chinese-American and Wong Shee. The family was going through a difficult economic situation and young Ong began his formal education sitting under a tree with the other boys in his native village. Ong found work as a cabin boy where he helped the cook in the ship's kitchen and carried buckets of food from the ship's kitchen to the forecastle where the ordinary seamen ate.

In 1919, Ong arrived in the United States via California's Angel Island in San Francisco. The fourteen-year-old was incarcerated for three months while authorities double-checked his United States citizenship.

Life in Phoenix

Ong lived in California during an era when California law excluded children from segregated schools if they didn't already know English. In 1920 he moved to Phoenix and went to live with the family of his uncle Henry Ong Sr. He entered first grade at Grant Elementary School. In four years he completed elementary school and two years later graduated from Phoenix Union High School. He was employed by Arizona Governor Thomas E. Campbell as a houseboy during his high school years.

Ong joined his uncle and cousins in the family business. However, his true passion was to become a lawyer someday. In 1927, his uncle, Henry, arranged a traditional Chinese marriage to sixteen-year-old Rose Wong, a girl who Ong had never met. His first encounter with his future wife was the same day that she arrived from China. The arranged wedding required a pact between both participants. He promised to help her brother and sister immigrate to the United States and she promised to support him in his goal to become a lawyer.

In 1938, Ong, together with his uncle Henry and various Chinese-American merchants, formed the Chinese Chamber of Commerce to protect and promote their businesses.

University of Arizona
Soon Ong established his own store at 1246 East Jefferson Street. He kept his promise and his brother-in-law and sister-in-law immigrated to the U.S.. His first child was born in the back of the grocery store where he worked and lived. Ong enrolled in the University of Arizona in Tucson and studied law. One of his classmates was future U.S. Senator Barry Goldwater. His wife and in-laws ran the store while he attended law school. The Campbells were so impressed by Ong when he worked for them that they financially supported him through law school.

In 1943, he graduated at the top of his law class and became an immigration attorney. At the time he was one of only eight Chinese-American lawyers in the U.S.. Ong set up a storefront  law office next to his grocery store, the Wing F. Ong Grocery Store at 1246 East Jefferson Street.

Politics

In 1944, Ong ran for the Arizona House of Representatives and lost by 17 votes. He continued his law practice and in 1946, ran for the State House of Representatives as a Democrat and was elected. He thus became the first Chinese American in the United States to be elected to a state legislative body. His campaign slogan was "Give the person who knows the law a chance to participate in politics".

He served two terms from 1946 to 1950 in said political position. As state representative, he backed welfare, education and job-security measures for those less fortunate.

As an immigration attorney Ong continued to help other Chinese immigrants from San Francisco who were facing the same difficulties and discrimination that he faced during his own immigration process. He practiced law for a short period of time in San Francisco, and in 1956, returned to Phoenix with his family. Ong then established a Chinese restaurant which he named "Wing's Restaurant" at 1617 E. Thomas Road. He established his law office on the second floor of the restaurant.

In 1965, Arizona Governor Sam Goddard appointed Ong as goodwill ambassador to China. In 1966, he ran for the State Senate of Arizona and was elected, becoming the first Chinese-American who entered the State Senate. He served one term from 1966 to 1968 in said position.

Later years
Ong purchased a new house at 2702 N. 7th Street. He returned to his law practice after he retired from politics. On December 19, 1977, he died at age 73 in Phoenix. He is buried in Phoenix's Greenwood/Memory Lawn Mortuary & Cemetery.

Further reading
 "Contemporary Immigration in America: A State-by-State Encyclopedia (2 volumes)"; By Kathleen R. Arnold; Publisher: Greenwood; .

See also

 Arizona
 List of historic properties in Phoenix
 Adam Perez Diaz

Arizona pioneers
 Mansel Carter
 Bill Downing
 Henry Garfias
 Winston C. Hackett
 John C. Lincoln
 Paul W. Litchfield
 Joe Mayer
 William John Murphy
 Levi Ruggles
 Sedona Schnebly
 Michael Sullivan
 Trinidad Swilling
 Ora Rush Weed
 Henry Wickenburg

References

1904 births
1977 deaths
Democratic Party Arizona state senators
Democratic Party members of the Arizona House of Representatives
University of Arizona alumni
21st-century American politicians
American politicians of Chinese descent
Asian-American people in Arizona politics
Politicians from Phoenix, Arizona
20th-century American politicians
Chinese emigrants to the United States